Howard A. "Howe" Welch was a professional football player for the Akron Indians. Around 1916, the Indians were briefly referred to as the Burkhardts, a semi-pro team was organized by  Suey around his brothers Howe and Chang, and Carl Cardarelli. After three seasons, Welch performed for and/or coached the Suey Welch-backed and managed Akron Indians playing against many of professional football's early stars including Al Nesser, Ralph Waldsmith and Fred Sefton.

References
 Summitt County Hall of Fame Inductees

Players of American football from Akron, Ohio
Akron Indians (Ohio League) players